Ingmar Maayen (born 29 January 1988, in Leiden) is a Dutch professional footballer of Curaçaoan descent who plays as a winger for SVV Scheveningen in the Dutch Topklasse. He formerly played for FC Utrecht, AGOVV Apeldoorn, FC Dordrecht, Etar Veliko Tarnovo and Telstar.

External links
 Voetbal International profile 

1988 births
Living people
Dutch footballers
FC Utrecht players
AGOVV Apeldoorn players
FC Dordrecht players
SC Telstar players
Eredivisie players
Eerste Divisie players
Derde Divisie players
Dutch sportspeople of Surinamese descent
Footballers from Leiden
Association football midfielders